Offaly West (sometimes spelled Ophaly) is a barony in County Kildare, Republic of Ireland.

Etymology
Offaly West takes its name from the Kingdom of Uí Failghe. It is not to be confused with County Offaly.

Location

Offaly West is located in west County Kildare, east of the River Barrow.

History
Offaly West were part of the ancient lands of the Ua Conchobhair Failghe (O'Connor Faly). As Lord of Clanmaliere the Ó Diomasaigh (O'Dempsey) held part of this barony. The Offaly barony was divided into east and west baronies before 1807.

List of settlements

Below is a list of settlements in Offaly West:
Monasterevin
Rathangan (part)

See also

Offaly East

References

Baronies of County Kildare